This is the discography of French singer Françoise Hardy.

Albums

Studio albums

Compilation albums

Singles and EPs
On the table below, until 1970, in France and Wallonia, the majority of Françoise Hardy's releases were EPs (represented in italics) and many were released as singles in other countries.

1960s

1970s

1980s

1990s–present

Notes

References

Discographies of French artists
Pop music discographies